An annular solar eclipse occurred on March 18, 1969. A solar eclipse occurs when the Moon passes between Earth and the Sun, thereby totally or partly obscuring the image of the Sun for a viewer on Earth. An annular solar eclipse occurs when the Moon's apparent diameter is smaller than the Sun's, blocking most of the Sun's light and causing the Sun to look like an annulus (ring). An annular eclipse appears as a partial eclipse over a region of the Earth thousands of kilometres wide. Annularity was visible from part of Indonesia, and two atolls (Faraulep and Gaferut) in the Trust Territory of the Pacific Islands which belongs to the Federated States of Micronesia now.

Related eclipses

Solar eclipses of 1968–1971

Saros 129

Tritos series

Metonic series

Notes

References

1969 3 18
1969 in science
1969 3 18
March 1969 events